Corallimorphus is a genus of colonial anthozoans similar in appearance to sea anemones and in body format to scleractinian stony corals. These animals are cnidarians in the family Corallimorphidae. Members of the genus live off the Pacific coast of the US.

Species
Species so far described in this genus include:
 Corallimorphus denhartogi Fautin, White & Pearson, 2002
 Corallimorphus ingens Gravier, 1918
 Corallimorphus niwa Fautin, 2011 
 Corallimorphus pilatus Fautin, White & Pearson, 2002
 Corallimorphus profundus Moseley, 1877
 Corallimorphus rigidus Moseley, 1877

References

Corallimorphidae
Hexacorallia genera